Wężewo may refer to the following places:
Wężewo, Masovian Voivodeship (east-central Poland)
Wężewo, Olecko County in Warmian-Masurian Voivodeship (north Poland)
Wężewo, Pisz County in Warmian-Masurian Voivodeship (north Poland)